Jaret Llewellyn (born 27 July 1970) is a retired Canadian water skier. Llewellyn is a four-time Pan American Games Champion when he won gold in men's water skiing events at the games in 1999, 2003, and 2 gold at the 2007 games. He won two silver medals at the 2015 Pan American Games while competing at the age of 44, just one week shy of his birthday. He is an 11-time world champion, 12-time Pan American Games medalist, and owns a record 117 professional titles. His son Dorien Llewellyn is also a professional water skier with Pan American Games titles and his older brother Kreg Llewellyn was also a professional water skier.

References 

1970 births
Living people
Canadian water skiers
Pan American Games gold medalists for Canada
Water skiers at the 2015 Pan American Games
Water skiers at the 2007 Pan American Games
Water skiers at the 2019 Pan American Games
Water skiers at the 2003 Pan American Games
Water skiers at the 1999 Pan American Games
Water skiers at the 2011 Pan American Games
Pan American Games silver medalists for Canada
Medalists at the 2015 Pan American Games
Medalists at the 2007 Pan American Games
Medalists at the 2003 Pan American Games
Medalists at the 1999 Pan American Games
Pan American Games medalists in water skiing